The 2018 IFSC Climbing World Cup was held in 14 locations. There were 22 events: 7 bouldering, 7 lead, and 8 speed events. The season began on 13 April in Meiringen, Switzerland, and concluded on 28 October in Xiamen, China.

The top 3 in each competition received medals, and the overall winners were awarded trophies. At the end of the season an overall ranking was determined based upon points, which athletes were awarded for finishing in the top 30 of each individual event.

The winners for bouldering were Jernej Kruder and Miho Nonaka, for lead Jakob Schubert and Janja Garnbret, for speed Bassa Mawem and Anouck Jaubert, and for combined Jakob Schubert and Janja Garnbret, men and women respectively.
The National Team for bouldering was Japan, for lead Austria, and for speed Russian Federation.

Highlights of the season 
In bouldering, at the World Cup in Munich, Janja Garnbret of Slovenia flashed all boulders in the final round to take the win.
Miho Nonaka and Akiyo Noguchi, both of Japan, were the only athletes who never missed a podium in all 7 bouldering competitions in the season.

In lead climbing, Janja Garnbret was the only athlete who never missed a podium in all 7 lead competitions in the season.

In speed climbing, at the first Speed World Cup of the season in Moscow, Anouck Jaubert of France matched the world record of 7.32 seconds set by Iuliia Kaplina of Russia at the 2017 World Games in Wrocław. Then at the end of the season, French athletes, Bassa Mawem and Anouck Jaubert clinched the overall titles of the season for men and women respectively, making it double speed titles for France.

Changes from the previous season 
For the 2018 season the IFSC changed the scoring method for its tournaments. Previously in bouldering, topped boulders were the deciding factor, followed as tiebreakers in decreasing order of importance: attempts to tops, bonus holds (renamed to zones), and attempts to bonus holds. The first and second tiebreakers switched places which means that the results were determined by tops, zones, attempts to tops, and attempts to zones. Also athletes now need to demonstrate firm control of the two starting hand holds. Previously touching all four marked start points in any manner was deemed sufficient to start an attempt.

Overview

Bouldering 

An overall ranking was determined based upon points, which athletes were awarded for finishing in the top 30 of each individual event. There were seven competitions in the season, but only the best six attempts were counted. The national ranking was the sum of the points of that country's three best male and female athletes. Results displayed in parentheses were not counted.

Men 
The results of the ten most successful athletes of the Bouldering World Cup 2018:

Women 
The results of the ten most successful athletes of the Bouldering World Cup 2018:

National Teams 
The results of the ten most successful countries of the Bouldering World Cup 2018:

Country names as used by the IFSC

Lead 

An overall ranking was determined based upon points, which athletes were awarded for finishing in the top 30 of each individual event.

Men 
6 best competition results were counted (not counting points in parentheses) for IFSC Climbing Worldcup 2018.

Women 
6 best competition results were counted (not counting points in brackets) for IFSC Climbing Worldcup 2018.

National Teams 
For National Team Ranking, 3 best results per competition and category were counted (not counting results in brackets).

Speed 

An overall ranking was determined based upon points, which athletes were awarded for finishing in the top 30 of each individual event.

Men 
7 best competition results were counted (not counting points in brackets) for IFSC Climbing World Cup 2018.

Women 
7 best competition results were counted (not counting points in brackets) for IFSC Climbing World Cup 2018.

National Teams 
For National Team Ranking, 3 best results per competition and category were counted (not counting results in brackets).

Combined 
The results of the ten most successful athletes of the Combined World Cup 2018:

Men

Women

Season podium table

Medal table

References

IFSC Climbing World Cup
2018 in sport climbing